Adarsh Vidya Mandir (AVM) is one of the largest and oldest educational institutes in the Kulgaon-Badlapur region.

History
Adarsh Vidya Mandir was founded by the late Mahadeo (Appa) Ramchandra Patankar, Laxman Atmaram Katadare, Dattatrey Sitaram Agasakar, and Bhagaji Ghorpade.

More recently the school has expanded to giving instruction from kindergarten to senior college. The senior college offers programs in the arts and commerce, leading to a BA degree, and in education leading to a BComm. The college is affiliated with University of Mumbai.

The institute enrolls almost 10,000 students and has served as a major educational backbone of the city. Students from this institute have regularly been listed in Secondary School Certificate and Higher Secondary Certificate examinations' merit lists.

Presently Tushar Sharad Apte is Chairman of the Sanstha (Institute), and Uday Suresh Kotwal is Secretary of the Sanstha; both are the ex-students of the Sanstha.
Presently Mrs. Rashmi Deshpande is Principal of the primary and secondary schools, and junior college, and Mrs. Sunita Bhalerao is Vice-principal.

Location
The Adarsh Vidya Mandir is located in Badlapur near the railway station, at coordinates .

External links
 School website
 University of Mumbai official website

Schools in Maharashtra
Universities and colleges in Maharashtra
University of Mumbai
Education in Thane district